Far from the Trees is a documentary film by Spanish artist and director Jacinto Esteva Grew. Shot in 1963, it was held up for nine years before its release in 1972.

A documentary told as a travelogue and intent on exposing the intense poverty of areas of Spain outside of the touristic eye, Far from the Trees is considered by some a successor to Luis Buñuel's Land Without Bread.  As a political statement, the film is a protest to the image of a newly modernized Spain being promoted by Franco.

References

External links
 

1972 films
1970s Spanish-language films
Documentary films about poverty
Spanish documentary films
1972 documentary films
1970s Spanish films